Andrzej Mazurkiewicz was a Polish footballer who played as a winger.

Starting his career at his hometown club Lech in 1955. He spent his whole career with them, with the exception of 2 years in the early 60s where he was forcibly called up to the army (mandatory 2 year military service was the norm at the time), therefore having to spend this time at one of the military sports clubs; he first went to Śląsk Wrocław and then Grunwald Poznań.

His career high came in 1961 noting 8 appearances and 1 goal in the Ekstraklasa with Lech Poznań. 

He was linked to Lech for over 60 years, as after he retired from playing he was the stadium sound and lighting engineer at the club.

References

Footballers from Poznań
Polish footballers
Association football forwards
Lech Poznań players
Ekstraklasa players
1941 births
2023 deaths